Robert "Bobby" Tossetti is an assistant American college basketball coach for the California State University San Bernardino men's basketball team, an NCAA Division II program that plays in the California Collegiate Athletic Association (CCAA).

Tossetti himself was a player in the CCAA. He played college ball for California State University Dominguez Hills located in Carson, California. In high school Tossetti was on the San Bernardino Pacific boys' basketball team.

References

Year of birth missing (living people)
Living people
American men's basketball players
Cal State Dominguez Hills Toros men's basketball players
Cal State San Bernardino Coyotes men's basketball coaches
College men's basketball head coaches in the United States